"Destination Eschaton" is a 1995 song recorded by Scottish band the Shamen, released as the first single from their sixth album, Axis Mutatis (1995). It features vocals by American guest vocalist Victoria Wilson James and was a hit in several countries in Europe, peaking within the top 10 in Finland and Scotland. In the UK, it peaked at number 15 in its first week at the UK Singles Chart, on 13 August 1995. In the US, the single reached number 14 on the Billboard Hot Dance Club Play chart.

Critical reception
John Bush from AllMusic complimented the song as "enjoyable". Larry Flick from Billboard called it "one of the act's better efforts." Steve Baltin from Cash Box described it as "a futuristic, fast-paced techno assault on the ears." He added, "The Shamen have already set themselves up as hit makers in the clubs, this new single should enjoy similar dance/club success. Particularly impressive is the enunciation they give to the vocals, showing that techno is not just about the beat, but words, as well. However, in this case, the beat is the star." In his weekly UK chart commentary in Dotmusic, James Masterton viewed it as "a well made single". A reviewer from Music & Media commented, "Very misleading—it's not as instantly catchy as their past singles, but rest assured memorability will grow with each spin. The Shamen remain on the top as the most melodic dance outfit."

Music video
A music video was produced to promote the single, directed by German director Nico Beyer and William Latham. It features the band performing aboard a spaceship.

Formats and track listings
 CD single, UK & France
 "Destination Eschaton" (Beatmasters 7") – 3:55
 "Destination Eschaton" (Destination Islington) (Shamen Deep Melodic Techno Mix) – 6:40

 CD single, US
 "Destination Eschaton" (Album Version) – 3:55
 "Destination Eschaton" (Vission Lorimer Dome Mix) – 4:16
 "Destination Eschaton" (Hardfloor 12" Vocal - Destination Krefeldton) – 7:25
 "Destination Eschaton" (Shamen Deep Melodic Techno Mix - Destination Islington) – 6:40
 "Destination Eschaton" (Sounds Of Life Vocal Mix) – 6:47

 CD maxi, Europe
 "Destination Eschaton" (Destination Nemeton Original Version) – 6:47
 "Destination Eschaton" (Shamen Deep Melodic Techno Mix) (Destination Islington) – 6:40
 "Destination Eschaton" (Shamen Acid) (Escacid) – 5:55
 "Destination Eschaton" (Hardfloor Vocal) (Destination Krefeldton) – 7:25
 "Destination Eschaton" (Hardfloor Instrumental) (Destination Komotion) – 7:22

Charts

References

 

1995 singles
The Shamen songs
1995 songs
Dance Pool singles
One Little Indian Records singles
Music videos directed by Nico Beyer